René Drouard de Bousset (12 December 1703 – 19 May 1760) was a French Baroque composer and organist. He was born in Paris on 12 December 1703.

He was the son of Jean-Baptiste Drouard de Bousset (d. 1725), minor nobility and maître de musique of the chapelle of the Louvre.

René was a pupil of Nicolas Bernier. In February 1739 Bousset was appointed organist at the parish church of St André-des-Arts, Paris, then simultaneously co-organist with Armand-Louis Couperin at Notre Dame de Paris and the church of Saint Merry from 1755 to 1760. He was a Jansenist and noted for a series of publications of cantatas on biblical subjects.

Bousset died on 19 May 1760.

Works
The catalogue of Bousset's works can be found on the Philidor Portal. Available recordings are listed.

Airs sérieux et à boire

Concertos en trio

Cantates spirituelles

Odes de Mr Rousseau

Lost Works 
Drouard de Bousset also composed an opera in 1729 L'Amour guéri par l'amour; 3 Grand Motets: Exaudiat te, Magnificat & Venite exultemus; 20 Petits Motets and a Book of Harpsichord Pieces published in 1754.

Publications 
 Ie. RECUEIL D'AIRS NOUVEAUX SERIEUX ET À BOIRE Dedié au Public COMPOSÉS PAR Mr. DE BOUSSET Maistre de Musique du Roy, pour les Academies des Inscriptions, et des Sciences. Gravé par du Plessy. Prix 3tt. SE VEND A PARIS. Chez L'Auteur, rüe du plastre au Marais. Le Sr. Boivin Marchand, rüe St. Honoré a la Regle d'Or. Le Sr. le Clerc, rüe du Roule a la Croix d'Or. Avec Privilege du Roy. 1731.
 IIe. RECUEIL D'AIRS NOUVEAUX SERIEUX ET À BOIRE Dedié au Public COMPOSÉS PAR Mr. DE BOUSSET Maistre de Musique du Roy, pour les Academies des Inscriptions, et des Sciences. Gravé par du Plessy. Prix 3tt. SE VEND A PARIS. Chez L'Auteur, rüe du plastre au Marais. Le Sr. Boivin Marchand, rüe St. Honoré a la Regle d'Or. Le Sr. le Clerc, rüe du Roule a la Croix d'Or./ Avec Privilege du Roy. 1731.
 CONCERTOS EN TRIOTS POUR LES VIELES ET MUSETTES Qui se peuvent joüer sur les Flutes Traversiere et a Bec, Hautbois et Violon. On peut doubler toutes les parties hors les Endroits Marqués Seuls et Duo. 1er Oeuvre. COMPOSÉS PAR Mr DE BOUSSET Maitre de Musique du Roy pour les Academies des Inscriptions, et des Sciences. 5tt En blanc. SE VENDENT A PARIS. Chez L'Auteur, rüe du Plastre Ste Avoye. La Veuve Boivin, rüe St Honoré a la Regle d'Or. Le Sr. le Clerc, rüe du Roule a la Croix d'Or. Avec Privilege du Roy. 1736.
 CANTATES SPIRITUELLES TIRÉES Des Pseaumes, des Histoires les plus interessantes de l'Ecriture Sainte, et autres sujets pieux. A Voix seule, avec Symphonie Et Sans Symphonie COMPOSÉES PAR Mr. DE BOUSSET Maître de Musique du Roy pour ses Academies des Inscriptions et des Sciences. Gravé par N. Baillieul le Jeune. PRIX EN BLANC 7.tt 10.s. Se Vendent a Paris chez l'Auteur ruë du Platre St. Avoye. La Veuve Boivin Mde. Ruë St. Honoré à la Regle d'Or, Le Sr. Le Clerc Md. Ruë du Roule à la Croix d'Or. Paris, l'auteur, Boivin, Le Clerc, 1739.
 IIeme RECEÜIL DE CANTATES SPIRITUELLES Tirées des Histoires les plus interessantes de L'ancien Testament. A Voix seule, et à deux Voix Avec Simphonie et sans Simphonie COMPOSÉES PAR MR. DE BOUSSET Maitre de Musique du Roy pour ses Academies des Inscriptions et des Sçiences. Organiste de l’Eglise Paroissiale de S. André des Arcs, et des Chanoines reguliers de Ste. Croix de la Bretonnerie. Gravées par Baillieul le jeune. Prix en blanc 4tt. SE VENDENT A PARIS Chez L'auteur ruë du Plâtre S. Avoye, La Veuve Boivin ruë S Honoré à la régle d'Or. Le Sr. Le Clerc rüe du Roule à la Croix d'Or. Le Sr. de la Guette Md. Libraire rüe St. Jacques à St. Antoine, et au Bon Pasteur. Avec Privilege du Roy 1740.
 Pièces de Clavecin composées par M. du Bousset Maître de Musique du Roi, pour ses Académies Royales des Inscriptions & des Sciences, & Organiste de la paroisse de S. André des Arts. Prix 6 liv. Chez l'Auteur, rue du Jouy, & aux Addresses ordinaires de Musique. 1754.

Other publications, editions, recordings
 annual motet for the oratory of the Académie des sciences
 Felicity Smith The music of René Drouard de Bousset (1703–1760): a source study 2008
 Judith cantata – on Le Passage de la Mer Rouge cantatas by Elisabeth Jacquet de la Guerre, Brossard and Bousset. Ensemble Le Tendre Amour, Barcelona, with Luanda Siqueira, soprano. K617. 2009
 Cantatas from psalms 83 and 147, cantatas Le naufrage de Pharaon and Abraham. Ensemble Le Tendre Amour, Barcelona, with Michiko Takahashi, soprano and Bernhard Hansky, baritone. Brilliant Classics. 2013

References

External links
 

1703 births
1760 deaths
French Baroque composers
French male classical composers
French classical organists
French male organists
Place of birth unknown
Place of death unknown
18th-century classical composers
18th-century keyboardists
18th-century French composers
18th-century French male musicians
17th-century male musicians
Male classical organists